is a Sanriku Railway Company station located in Kamaishi, Iwate Prefecture, Japan.

Lines
Ryōishi Station was served by the Rias Line, and was located 42.7 rail kilometers from the terminus of the line at Sakari Station.

Station layout
Ryōishi Station had a single side platform serving traffic in both directions.  There was no station building, but only a shelter on the platform. The station was unattended.

Adjacent stations

History
Ryōishi Station opened on 23 July 1951 as an intermediate station of Yamada Line. The station was absorbed into the JR East network upon the privatization of the Japan National Railways (JNR) on 1 April 1987. Operations on the Yamada Line between Miyako Station and Kamaishi Station were suspended after the 11 March 2011 Tōhoku earthquake and tsunami. As of 2018, the station have been rebuilt along with the rest of the closed segment of the Yamada Line. It was transferred to the Sanriku Railway upon completion on 23 March 2019. This segment joined up with the Kita-Rias Line on one side and the Minami-Rias Line on the other, which together constitutes the entire Rias Line. Accordingly, this station became an intermediate station of Rias Line.

Surrounding area
  National Route 45
 Ryōishi Fishing Port

References

External links
 JR East Station information 

Railway stations in Iwate Prefecture
Rias Line
Railway stations in Japan opened in 1951